was a Japanese freestyle swimmer. She participated in two Olympic Games with Hideko Maehata, both of whom were from the same area, and Moriaka competed the individual 400 m and 4 × 100 m relay events at the 1932 and 1936 Summer Olympics with the best result of fifth place in the relay in 1932.

References

External links
 
 
 

1915 births
Year of death missing
Olympic swimmers of Japan
Swimmers at the 1932 Summer Olympics
Swimmers at the 1936 Summer Olympics
Japanese female freestyle swimmers
People from Hashimoto, Wakayama
Sportspeople from Wakayama Prefecture
20th-century Japanese women